Dead Neanderthals is a Dutch free-jazz band that also incorporates metal and grindcore. They have released several albums, many of which were based on improvisation.

History
Dead Neanderthals is composed of two members, Otto Kokke on saxophone and synthesizer and René Aquarius on drums. After first collaborating online, they began improvising live, and have released several albums. The Quietus described their 2012 album Jazzhammer/Stormannsgalskap as a mighty "pounding headache of rampaging blastbeats, distorted foghorn drones and radioactive seagull squalls." Their fourth album, Polaris, was in contrast completely acoustic.

Style
According to The Quietus, "Whether forcing the twitching viscera of free jazz through a grindcore blender, slicing the eyeball of European improvisation with a metal blade, or eviscerating the whole lot in a maelstrom of noise, the sax-drums duo of Otto Kokke and Rene Aquarius pay little heed to the boundaries of genre.

Members
Current
 Otto Kokke – saxophone
 René Aquarius – drums

Discography

Albums

Further reading

Dead Neanderthals Discography at Discogs

References

External links
Dead Neanderthals

Dutch jazz ensembles
Utech Records artists